Carlton Hayes Hospital, Narborough, Leicestershire was the psychiatric hospital of Leicestershire from 1907 to 1995.

History
The complex was built to the designs of Samuel Perkins Pick (1858-1919), a well-known Leicester architect, in the Art Nouveau style as the Leicestershire County Asylum and was officially opened on 1 October 1907. It became known as the Leicestershire and Rutland Mental Hospital in 1914.

Significant extensions designed by William Keay were completed in the 1930s. It became Carlton Hayes Hospital in 1939 and joined the National Health Service in 1948. Philip Larkin's mother was a patient in the hospital in 1956: he described it as "large and dingy as a London terminus".

The complex was demolished after 1996, and the site redeveloped by the Alliance & Leicester Building Society for their new headquarters.

References

Former psychiatric hospitals in England
Hospital buildings completed in 1904
Hospitals in Leicestershire
History of Leicestershire
Defunct hospitals in England
Hospitals established in 1904
1904 establishments in England
1995 disestablishments in England
Hospitals disestablished in 1995